Ilkeston railway station may refer to several stations in England:

Ilkeston railway station (Opened 2017)
Ilkeston Junction and Cossall railway station (1847–1967)
Ilkeston North railway station (1878–1964)
Ilkeston Town railway station (1847–1950)